Kristina Valentinovna Petrovskaya (born June 3, 1980) is a retired Russian ice hockey defenceman. She competed with the Russian women's national ice hockey team in the 2002, 2006, and 2010 Winter Olympic tournaments.

Career stats

Minnesota Duluth Bulldogs

References

1980 births
Living people
Ice hockey players at the 2002 Winter Olympics
Ice hockey players at the 2006 Winter Olympics
Ice hockey players at the 2010 Winter Olympics
Minnesota Duluth Bulldogs women's ice hockey players
Olympic ice hockey players of Russia
People from Solnechny District
Russian women's ice hockey defencemen
HC Tornado players
Sportspeople from Khabarovsk Krai